Budești (Romani: Budeshti) is a small provincial town in Călărași County, Muntenia, Romania. Three villages are administered by the town: Aprozi, Buciumeni, and Gruiu. It officially became a town in 1989, as a result of the Romanian rural systematization program.

Geography
The town lies in the southwestern corner of the Bărăgan Plain, where the river Dâmbovița flows into the Argeș. 

Budești is located in the western part of Călărași County, on the border with Giurgiu County.

Demographics

According to the 2011 census, Budești has a population of 7,024 people. It is the Romanian town with the largest proportion of Romani. As one of two urban areas where Romani make up more than 20% of the total population, Budești is also the one of two towns in Romania where the Romani language has co-official status alongside Romanian, with education, signage, and public service provided in both languages. 62% of the town's population is of Romanian ethnicity and 37.8% is of Romani ethnicity.

In terms of religion, 99.59% of the population declared themselves to be Romanian Orthodox at the 2002 census, 0.28% were Pentecostal, and 0.11% declared another religion.

Natives
 Costică Canacheu
 Iulică Cazan
 Marian Sârbu

See also
 List of towns in Romania by Romani population
 Romani people in Romania

References

External links

 2011 census data for Budești

Populated places in Călărași County
Localities in Muntenia
Towns in Romania
Romani communities in Romania